The 2011–12 Big 12 Conference men's basketball season began with practices on October 15, 2011 and ended with the Big 12 Tournament, won by Missouri on March 10, 2012 at the Sprint Center in Kansas City.

It was the first season in which 10 teams participated, since Colorado left for the Pac-12 and Nebraska joined the Big Ten. It was also the final season in this conference for Texas A&M and Missouri before they both joined the SEC for the 2012–13 season.

Pre-season polls and teams
Pre-Season Poll:

Pre-Season All-Big 12 Teams

Players in bold are choices for Big 12 Player of the Year

Rankings

Postseason

2012 NBA draft

The following current 1st, 2nd & 3rd team All-Big 12 performers were listed as seniors: Tyshawn Taylor, Marcus Denmon, Quincy Acy, Keiton Page, Scott Christopherson, Kim English The deadline for entering the NBA draft is April 29, but once one has declared, the deadline for withdrawing the declaration and retaining NCAA eligibility is April 10. The deadline for submitting information to the NBA Advisory Committee for a 72-hour response is April 3.
The following Big 12 underclassmen have sought the advice of the NBA's undergraduate advisory committee to determine his draft prospects.
The following Big 12 underclassmen declared early for the 2011 draft: Royce White, J'Covan Brown, Thomas Robinson, Perry Jones III, Khris Middleton, Quincy Miller
The following Big 12 underclassmen entered their name in the draft but who did not hire agents and opted to return to college:

References